Neukirch West is a railway station in the town of Neukirch/Lausitz, Saxony, Germany. The station lies on the Bautzen–Bad Schandau railway and Neukirch West–Bischofswerda railway.

The station is served by one train service, operated by Vogtlandbahn. There is a regular service from Dresden to Zittau via Bischofswerda, Wilthen and Ebersbach.

References

External links
 
 Vogtlandbahn website
 Oberlausitzer Eisenbahnen website 
 Neukirch West station at www.verkerhsmittelvergleich.de 

Railway stations in Saxony
Railway stations in Germany opened in 1877